Nataliya Popova (born 26 May 1980) is a Kazakhstani diver. She competed in the women's 3 metre springboard event at the 2000 Summer Olympics.

References

1980 births
Living people
Kazakhstani female divers
Olympic divers of Kazakhstan
Divers at the 2000 Summer Olympics
Sportspeople from Almaty
21st-century Kazakhstani women